is a 2001 action-adventure game developed by Capcom Production Studio 4 and published by Capcom. Released from August to December, originally for the PlayStation 2, it is the first installment in the Devil May Cry series. Set in modern times on the fictional Mallet Island, the story centers on Dante, a demon hunter who uses his business to carry out a lifelong vendetta against all demons. He meets a woman named Trish who takes him on a journey to defeat the demon lord Mundus, who is responsible for the deaths of Dante's brother and mother. The story is told primarily through a mixture of cutscenes, which use the game engine and several pre-rendered full motion videos. The game is very loosely based on the Italian poem Divine Comedy by the use of allusions, including the game's protagonist Dante (named after Dante Alighieri) and other characters like Trish (Beatrice Portinari) and Vergil (Virgil).

The game was originally conceived by Capcom developers as Resident Evil 4. Due to the staff feeling it would not fit the Resident Evil franchise, the project became its own title. Several gameplay elements were also inspired by a bug found in Onimusha: Warlords. Devil May Cry received prominent coverage in the video game media due to the impact it had in the action-adventure genre, its high difficulty, and the high overall scores given to it by professional reviewers. The game has sold more than three million copies, spawned multiple sequels and a prequel, and is considered among the greatest video games of all time.

Gameplay
The gameplay consists of levels called "missions", where players must fight numerous enemies, perform platforming tasks, and occasionally solve puzzles to progress through the story. The player's performance in each mission is given a letter grade, starting with D, increasing to C, B, and A, with an additional top grade of S. Grades are based on the time taken to complete the mission, the amount of "red orbs" gathered (the in-game currency obtained from defeated enemies, destroyed objects, and exploration), how "stylish" their combat was, item usage, and damage taken.

"Stylish" combat is defined as performing an unbroken series of varied attacks while avoiding damage, with player performance tracked by an on-screen gauge. The more hits the player makes, the higher the gauge rises. The gauge starts at "Dull"; progresses through "Cool", "Bravo", and "Absolute"; and peaks at "Stylish". Repeatedly using the same moves causes the gauge to stop rising, encouraging the player to use every move in their arsenal. The gauge terms are similar to the grades given at the end of the missions. When Dante receives damage, the style rating resets back to "Dull". Players can also maintain their style grade by taunting enemies at close range.

The player can temporarily transform Dante into a more powerful demonic creature by using the "Devil Trigger" ability. Doing so adds powers based on the current weapon and changes Dante's appearance. The transformations typically increase strength and defense, slowly restore health, and grant special attacks. The ability is governed by the Devil Trigger gauge, which depletes as the ability is used, and is refilled by attacking enemies or taunting in normal form.

Devil May Cry contains puzzles and other challenges besides regular combat gameplay. The main storyline often requires the player to find key items to advance, in a manner similar to puzzles in the Resident Evil games, as well as optional platforming and exploration tasks to find hidden caches of "orbs". Side quests, called "Secret Missions" in the game, are located in hidden or out-of-the-way areas and are not required for completion, but provide permanent power-ups. They typically challenge the player to defeat a group of enemies in a specific manner or within a time limit, or solve a puzzle.

Plot

Devil May Cry begins with Dante being attacked in his office by a mysterious woman named Trish. He impresses her by easily brushing off her assault, and explains that for years, he has hunted demons in pursuit of the ones who killed his mother and brother. Trish explains that her attack was a test, and that the demon emperor Mundus, whom Dante holds responsible for the deaths of his family, is planning to cross over into the human world after centuries of imprisonment. The scene jumps to their arrival at an immense castle on the mysterious Mallet Island, where Mundus has steadily grown his power and influence over the years in preparation for his ascension. Trish quickly abandons Dante, who is forced to continue on his own.

Dante explores the castle, fighting off demons summoned by Mundus to attack him and overcoming all sorts of devious puzzles, traps, and tricks. He also obtains two magical weapons, a sword called Alastor and a pair of gauntlets known as Ifrit, and encounters the first of Mundus' servants, a giant spider/scorpion demon known as Phantom. Dante wins their battle, but Phantom escapes and swears revenge before Dante eventually impales and kills him. Dante goes on to defeat the other servants: a giant demon bird known as Griffon, a living bioweapon referred to as Nightmare, and a masked "dark knight" known as Nelo Angelo who impresses Dante with his confidence. In their first battle, Dante manages to defeat Nelo Angelo and is about to deliver the final blow when his opponent suddenly overpowers him. Nelo Angelo prepares to kill Dante, but hesitates and then flees upon seeing the half-amulet Dante wears, which contains a picture of his mother. After two more encounters, his true identity is revealed as Dante's identical twin brother, Vergil, brainwashed by Mundus and made one of his minions. After Vergil seemingly dies, his amulet joins with his brother's half, and "Force Edge",  Dante's primary sword which he inherited from his father, changes into its true form and becomes the Sparda sword.

When Dante tries to save Trish from Nightmare, she betrays him and reveals that she is a spy for Mundus, but when her life is endangered, Dante chooses to save her. Claiming he did so only because of her resemblance to his mother, he warns her to stay away. Yet when he finally confronts Mundus, who is about to kill Trish, Dante again chooses to save her and is injured. Mundus fires a beam to kill him, but Trish takes the attack instead. This unleashes Dante's full power, thus allowing him to take on the form of Sparda. Dante and Mundus then battle on another plane of existence.

Despite Mundus' overwhelming power, Dante is victorious, and, believing her to be dead, leaves his amulet and sword with Trish's body before departing. Returning to the island, Dante finds that the castle is collapsing, and is cornered by the injured Mundus, having used the last of his power to cross over into the human world. Dante fights Mundus, but is unable to defeat him until Trish suddenly appears and infuses Dante's guns with her magic. Dante banishes Mundus back to the demon world, and the emperor vows to one day return and finish his conquest. When Trish tries to apologize, she begins to cry, and Dante tells her it means she has become human and not just a devil, because "devils never cry". Dante and Trish escape on an old biplane as the island falls into the sea. After the credits, it is revealed that Dante and Trish are working together as partners, and have renamed Dante's business "Devil Never Cry".

Development

First hinted at in early December 1999, Devil May Cry started out as the earliest incarnation of Resident Evil 4. Initially developed for the PlayStation 2, the game was directed by Hideki Kamiya after producer Shinji Mikami requested him to create a new entry in the Resident Evil series. Around the turn of the millennium, regular series writer Noboru Sugimura created a scenario for the title, based on Kamiya's idea to make a very cool and stylized action-adventure game. The story was based on unraveling the mystery surrounding the body of protagonist Tony, an invincible man with skills and an intellect exceeding that of normal people, his superhuman abilities explained with biotechnology. As Kamiya felt the playable character did not look brave and heroic enough in battles from a fixed angle, he decided to drop the prerendered backgrounds from previous Resident Evil installments and instead opted for a dynamic camera system. This new direction required the team to make a trip to Europe where they spent eleven days in the United Kingdom and Spain photographing things like Gothic statues, bricks, and stone pavements for use in textures.

Though the developers tried to make the "coolness" theme fit into the world of Resident Evil, Mikami felt it strayed too far from the series' survival horror roots and gradually convinced all of the staff members to make the game independent from it. Kamiya eventually rewrote the story to be set in a world full of demons, taking it from the Italian epic poem Divine Comedy by Dante Alighieri; he changed the hero's name to "Dante". The title character from Buichi Terasawa's manga series Cobra served as the basis for Dante's personality. Kamiya based his idea of Dante on what he perceived as stylish: wearing a long coat to make the character "showy" and a non-smoker, as Kamiya saw that as "cool". The character wears red because, in Japan, it is a traditional color for a heroic figure. Kamiya has also stated he perceives Dante as "a character that you would want to go out drinking with", someone who was not a show-off but would instead "pull some ridiculous, mischievous joke" to endear people to him. He added that this aspect was intended to make the character feel familiar to audiences. The cast of characters remained largely identical to that in Sugimura's scenario, although appearances of the hero's mother and father were written out of the story. The game's new title was revealed as Devil May Cry in November 2000.

The game was developed by Team Little Devils, a group of staff members within Capcom Production Studio 4. Some of the major gameplay elements were partially inspired by a bug found in Onimusha: Warlords. During a test-play, Kamiya discovered that enemies could be kept in the air by slashing them repeatedly, which led to the inclusion of juggles by gunfire and sword strikes in Devil May Cry. According to the director, Devil May Cry was designed from the ground up around Dante's acrobatics and combat abilities. The decision was made late in the development process to change the game to a more mission-based advancement, instead of the more open-ended structure of the Resident Evil games. Devil May Crys difficulty was intentional, according to Kamiya, who called it his "challenge to those who played light, casual games". 

According to Eurogamer, an earlier Capcom arcade video game, Strider (1989), was a vital influence on Devil May Cry. According to Retro Gamer, the over-the-top action of Devil May Cry draws from Strider.

Reception

Devil May Cry received a "Gold" sales award from the Entertainment and Leisure Software Publishers Association (ELSPA), indicating sales of at least 200,000 copies in the United Kingdom. By July 2006, Devil May Cry had sold 1.1 million copies and earned $38 million in the United States alone. Next Generation ranked it as the 48th highest-selling game launched for the PlayStation 2, Xbox or GameCube between January 2000 and July 2006 in that country. Combined sales of the Devil May Cry series reached 2 million units in the United States by July 2006.

The game received critical acclaim, with reviews from video game news websites typically praising its gameplay innovations, action, visuals, camera control, and gothic ambience. The game also received positive reviews from video game print publications for similar reasons. Game Informer summarized their review by saying the game "makes Resident Evil look like a slow zombie". It was nominated for GameSpots annual "Best Action/Adventure Game" prize among console games, which went to Grand Theft Auto III. Devil May Cry also frequents several Top Video Games of All Time lists. Gamefury, for instance, listed Devil May Cry at #31 in their Top 40 Console Games of All Time feature. In 2010, IGN listed it at #42 in their "Top 100 PlayStation 2 Games". Dante also received noteworthy praise to the point of becoming one of the most famous characters in gaming.

The game was also subject to criticism, however. Next Generation objected to the difficulty level, wondering if the challenge was added to prolong the gameplay. The Electric Playground pointed to the unusual control scheme and lack of configuration options. GameSpy cited the camera's behavior, the learning curve for the controls, and graphical shortcomings such as flickering and jagginess. GameSpot criticized the game's conclusion for its dramatic change in gameplay to a rail shooter-like style at the story's climax, as well as a leveling-off of the difficulty. Lastly, Gamecritics felt that the story was overly short and the characters were underdeveloped.

Legacy
Devil May Cry has spawned a sequel, Devil May Cry 2 and a prequel, Devil May Cry 3; both of which have sold more than two million copies. A fourth game, Devil May Cry 4, was released on February 5, 2008 in the United States for PlayStation 3, Xbox 360 and PC. Total sales for all versions as of February 10, 2016 is well over 3 million copies. The game has likewise resulted in the release of two novels by Shinya Goikeda, and an anime series. On October 15, 2004, three years after the game's release, a soundtrack containing the game's music was released alongside the soundtrack to Devil May Cry 2. Plans for a PlayStation Portable installment, tentatively titled Devil May Cry Series, and a live action film adaptation have been announced, although it was later confirmed in 2009 that the PSP adaptation of Devil May Cry was officially cancelled. A reboot titled DmC: Devil May Cry was released in 2013 by Ninja Theory and Capcom. Kamiya considers his 2009 video game Bayonetta to have evolved from Devil May Cry although he played the sequel Devil May Cry 4 when developing it. In a 2017 interview with Dengeki PlayStation, Kamiya expressed interest in making a remake of Devil May Cry. A fifth installment, Devil May Cry 5 was released on March 8, 2019. The game was ported to the Nintendo Switch on June 25, 2019 worldwide and on June 27, 2019 in Japan.

Devil May Cry has been cited as the beginning of a subgenre of arcade-style hack and slash melee focused action-adventure games called "character action" or "Extreme Combat", which focus on powerful heroes fighting hordes of foes with a focus on stylish action. The game has also been described as being the first game that "successfully captured the twitch-based, relentlessly free-flowing gameplay style of so many classic 2D action games". The series has become the standard against which other 3D action-adventure games are measured, with comparisons in reviews of games including God of War, Chaos Legion, and Blood Will Tell.

See also
Bayonetta
Dante's Inferno, another game based on Inferno by Dante Alighieri
Devil May Cry

Notes

References

External links
 

2001 video games
Action-adventure games
Capcom games
Dark fantasy video games
Devil May Cry
Hack and slash games
Nintendo Switch games
PlayStation 2 games
PlayStation 3 games
PlayStation 4 games
PlayStation 4 Pro enhanced games
Single-player video games
Video games about demons
Video games about siblings
Video games based on mythology 
Video games developed in Japan
Video games directed by Hideki Kamiya
Video games scored by Masato Kouda
Video games set in castles
Video games set on fictional islands
Windows games
Xbox 360 games
Xbox One games
Xbox One X enhanced games
Works based on the Divine Comedy